The Journal of Pharmacy and Pharmaceutical Sciences is an open access peer-reviewed medical journal covering all aspects of pharmacy and pharmaceutical sciences. It was established in 1998, and is published and financially sponsored by the Canadian Society for Pharmaceutical Sciences. The editor-in-chief is Fakhreddin Jamali (University of Alberta). The Journal does not charge fees for neither publishing nor subscription. According to the Journal Citation Reports, the journal has a 2017 impact factor of 2.33.

References

External links

English-language journals
Publications established in 1998
Triannual journals
Pharmacy in Canada
Pharmacology journals